Ermysted's Grammar School is an 11-18 boys voluntary aided grammar school in Skipton, North Yorkshire, England. It was founded by Peter Toller in the 15th century and is the seventh oldest state school in Britain. The first official record of the school was seen in Peter Toller's will in 1492; the school records its establishment as the same year, though its history could possibly be dated to 1468. The school operates a house system. The four houses—Toller, Ermysted, Petyt, and Hartley—are named after key figures in the school's history. When the school operated a boarding house, its boarders were members of School House.

There are 840 currently enrolled students. The sixth form is formed from boys graduating Key Stage 4, as well as 20 additional boys. The current headmaster is Michael Evans; his predecessor, Graham Hamilton, retired at the end of the 2015-2016 school year.

In 2008, it was reported that the school achieved the best Yorkshire state-school A-level exam results, and in 2007 the school came 76th in the top 100 UK schools in terms of Oxbridge admissions.

History timeline

Founding, eighteenth-century bequests, siting, and land usage
In 1492, Peter Toller's will confirmed that he had already founded a school in his chantry of St Nicholas in the parish church, the school takes this as its founding date. In 1548, Edward VI's government took over all chantry lands. William Ermysted re-founded the school with new lands and moved it to the bottom of Shortbank Road. In 1707 and 1719, the wills of Old Boys William and Sylvester Petyt made bequests to the school, and enabled the foundation of the Petyt Library and Petyt Trust. The Leeds and Liverpool Canal reached Skipton in 1773, partly built on E.G.S. land.

Nineteenth-century building
In 1875, the Gargrave Road building was begun to accommodate 50 day boys and 50 boarders; and, from 1876 to 1907, Mr E. T. Hartley served as headmaster of the new school. In 1882, the Pool and the Old Gym (now I.C.T., music and R.S. rooms) begun, and in 1895 the Science block was built (now A.P.L. and staff quiet room).

Twentieth century
The school has two memorials to the two World Wars. The First World War memorial library was set up by the Old Boys' Society (now the Governors' Board Room) in 1924, and in 1959 the Memorial Hall was opened to those lost in the Second World War. The school opened the 'new buildings' in 1933 (now classrooms) and closed its doors to boarding pupils in 1989. The school celebrated the Quincentenary of the school's founding in 1992, which included a visit by H.R.H. The Princess Royal, a pageant, and a new commemorative sports hall.

Current buildings
The school is now situated between Gargrave Road and Grassington Road, although the sixteenth-century school house can still be seen on Shortbank Road. The majority of buildings date from the 19th and early 20th centuries, although many newer buildings now exist. The latter include the sports hall, opened in 1992 to commemorate the school's 500th anniversary; the £7 million Refectory development north of the main site; the English Block, which houses the school's CDT and English departments, in addition to one of four ICT facilities; and a sixth-form centre, built in 2016.

Ofsted inspections
In the 2000 Ofsted inspection, the school's results were "very high" against the national average, especially upon entry, where year 7s (age 11/12) work to a level "expected of pupils aged 14". An "outstanding" 6th form with a wide range of subjects was noted. The school was considered "very successful" at allowing pupils to reach high academic standards, and the quality of teaching is "good".

In the 2005 Ofsted inspection, the sixth form was described as "outstanding" and achieved Grade 1 Outstanding in every category of assessment.

The 2008 Ofsted inspection was on 22 October, and the school received an "outstanding" verdict overall. Seven out of eight areas were given an outstanding verdict.

In the September 2022 Ofsted inspection, the school was rated "good" overall. Four of the five areas were given an outstanding verdict, with quality of education the only area achieving "good". According to the report, teachers should ensure Key Stage 3 students are secure in their knowledge before moving on to new content. Sixth form provision is rated "outstanding" with lessons having a professional atmosphere, allowing for high-quality debate and discussion. The partnership with Skipton Girls High School to expand the number of A-Level options is described as "valuable", while GCSE outcomes across all subject areas are "very positive" for pupils.

Events
The school has two principal annual events. Founders' Day takes place in December, when a service is held in Skipton Parish Church to commemorate the school's founders and benefactors. Many Old Boys attend both the service and the Annual Dinner, which follows the Old Boys' Society annual general meeting (AGM). Speech Day, in July, is the annual prize-giving and summation of the school year. In addition to these two events, the Parents' Association organises many social and fund-raising events, such as a biennial ball, wine tasting, and big-band nights.

Sport

The school competes in rugby union, cross country running, orienteering, cricket, and football tournaments. Occurring annually in the summer term is Sports Day, during which students compete at athletics.

Music
The school's Big Band has toured Germany four times, most recently in 2016 under the tutelage of music teacher Geoffrey Cloke. Another Simbach trip is planned for July 2023. The first tour took place in 2004 followed by a subsequent visit to Skipton’s twin town, Simbach am Inn, in 2007 and a tour of the Rhine Valley in 2010 with the previous Head of Music, Simon Gregory. To date, they have produced three CDs with Simon Gregory. Ermysted's also has a developing starting group (named the Training Band), which provides ensemble experience to young pupils and solo experience to the virtuosic older pupils. The school's main Swing Band is for pupils of Grade 5 standard or above, and is conducted by a sixth former. Termly concerts involve all the main music groups, with the one traditionally played in summer outside in the Quad. A virtual concert was recorded in Spring 2022 as a result of the Covid-19 pandemic.

There are now three practice rooms, in addition to the main music room and the hall, available for pupils and their amateur bands to rehearse in.

House music is held every November, where pupils compete to earn House Points which contribute to the House Cup. Prior to 2020, this consisted of four musicians from each house each performing a single piece. This was revised in 2021 with the format now requiring all Year 7 and 8 pupils to perform a song in their form groups, in order to promote musical involvement in the lower school.

Drama
Although Drama is not taught as a subject in its own right, it forms an integral part of the English curriculum, and a weekly Drama Club meets.

Drama productions occur once every two years, in conjunction with Skipton Girls' High School, typically directed jointly by sixth formers from both schools. In addition to various pantomimes and subject-related (namely Latin and Modern Foreign Languages) drama activities, house plays by Years 7–9 occur annually in the Autumn term, with an independent adjudicator voting for the best play.

A group of pupils also take part in the annual English Schools' Shakespeare Festival. In 2007, an edited version of Julius Caesar was performed at Bradford's Priestley Theatre. Just before the Autumn half-term in 2008, an abridged version of Hamlet was performed at the West Yorkshire Playhouse.

In recent years, film has emerged as an increasingly popular form of drama at the school, leading to the first Ermytainers Film Festival being held on 12 July 2013, and showcasing a range of student films.

Debating
The school has a long history of competitive debating; and after a hiatus of some years, a debating club was set up in late 2006. The school puts forward teams in many events with some success: in 2007, Ermysted's pupils were placed third, out of 24 schools, in the Great Shakespeare Debate, in Stratford-upon-Avon; and they reached the regional final of the ESU Schools Debating Mace. In 2009–2010, Ermysted's Sixth-formers went a step further, participating in the European Youth Parliament Debating Forum National Final, having won the Yorkshire and Humberside Regional Final, and winning the Great Shakespeare Debate outright.

School publication
The Chronicles of Ermysted's is the official annual school magazine, containing details of school events, student visits, results, and school activities, although in recent years its publication has been somewhat hit-and-miss.

The school also publishes a termly newspaper edited by students called The Reason. Named after the school's motto it is fully funded through adverts from local businesses and sales. Furthermore, the paper is written and edited by students.

Notable former pupils

 Simon Beaufoy, Writer of Oscar-winning film The Full Monty and the Oscar-winning Slumdog Millionaire (for which he received both a BAFTA and an Oscar for Best Adapted Screenplay)
 Herbie Farnworth Rugby League player
 William Harbutt Dawson, author (1860–1948)
 Prof. William Siegfried Dawson, psychiatrist (1891–1975)
 Prof. John Desmond Hargreaves, historian
 Rev. Eric William Heaton, Pro Vice Chancellor Oxford University (1920–1996)
 Andrew Hodgson, former Bradford Bulls rugby league player
 Richard Holden of the Conservative and Unionist Party, MP for North West Durham Elected 2019
 Rick Holden, former Manchester City player and former Barnsley FC Assistant Manager
 Geoffrey Horne author of the Sergeant Cluff series between 1960 and 1978
 Jonathan Linsley, actor (Last of the Summer Wine, Pirates of the Caribbean)
 Iain Macleod, Conservative MP for Enfield West from 1950–70 and former Chancellor of the Exchequer in 1970
 Chris Mason (born 1980), BBC journalist
 Blake Morrison, poet and author
 Paul Zenon, comedian and magician

References

External links
 
 
 Ermytainers Production Company

1492 establishments in England
Boys' schools in North Yorkshire
Educational institutions established in the 15th century
Grammar schools in North Yorkshire

Skipton
Voluntary aided schools in Yorkshire